Erfan-e-Halgheh, also known as Erfan-e-Halqeh, Erfan-e-Kayhani, Erfan Kaihan, Cosmic Mysticism, Interuniversal Mysticism, and Mysticism of the Ring, is a spiritual movement which was started in Iran by mystic Mohammad Ali Taheri four decades ago. The movement promotes ideas and practices that seek to establish a connection between the individual and cosmic consciousness.

Erfan-e-Halgheh centers are spread worldwide and are present in Austria, Denmark, Canada, Sweden, United Kingdom, and the United States.

History

Background 
Iran has a rich tradition surrounding mystical culture which is known as Erfan in Iran. Erfan is a Persian language word which means "knowing" and is often compared to Greco-Christian concept of gnosis. According to Taheri, "the term is used to refer both to Islamic mysticism as well as the attainment of spiritual knowledge springing from the direct insight".

Erfan was established in Iran in the eleventh century and since then has developed a variety of rich forms, rituals, and practices. For many Iranians, Erfan is an expression of personal religion or personal relation with the God.

Erfan also overlaps significantly with Sufism. Sufism is a way of life in which one seeks direct consciousness in presence of God while the purpose of Erfan is to seek the state of "kamal" (attainment of perfection or completeness). According to the New Encyclopedia Britannica, "Erfan consists of a variety of mystical paths that are designed to ascertain the nature of humanity and of God and to facilitate the experience of the presence of divine love and wisdom in the world".

Erfan-e-Halgheh 
A new path of Erfan was started by an Iranian mystic Mohammad Ali Taheri after intuitions forty years ago. It is also known as Interuniversal Mysticism. The term Interuniversal Mysticism, according to Taheri, refers to a kind of mystical thought.

Persecution 
The movement became wildly popular in urban centers of Iran. Because of the movement's popularity, Iranian authorities started persecuting Interuniversal Mysticism followers in 2010. Since then, the founder of the movement has been kept in prison for eight years and the activities of the followers have been forbidden in Iran.

In August 2015, two followers of the Erfan Halghe, Fahimeh A’rafi and Ziba Pour Habib were arrested. Ziba Pour Habib was an activist of the movement and was charged for insulting the sanctities. She was sentenced to three years and was transferred to notorious Evin Prison. Whereas, Fahimeh A’rafi was arrested from her home by the Iranian Revolutionary Guards and was transferred to Gharchak Prison to serve five-year imprisonment for insulting the sanctities.

In November 2015, Sara Sa’ie was arrested during her participation in the rally, protesting Mohammad Ali Taheri's death sentence. During the same rally, another women, Zahra Sadat Ibrahimi, was also arrested.

References

Works cited 
 
 
 

Mysticism